Dominion Tower can refer to several buildings, either currently and former named Dominion Tower:

 Dominion Tower (Miami)
 Dominion Tower (Norfolk)

Formerly named Dominion Tower:
 Benson Tower (New Orleans)
 EQT Plaza Pittsburgh

See also
 Toronto-Dominion Bank Tower, Toronto, Ontario